Bryn Thomas (born 19 August 1979) is a South African cricketer. He played in thirteen first-class and twelve List A matches for Border in 2009 and 2010.

See also
 List of Border representative cricketers

References

External links
 

1979 births
Living people
South African cricketers
Border cricketers
Cricketers from Durban